Missanelli is a surname. Notable people with the surname include:

 Mike Missanelli (born 1955), American radio host
 Niccolò Francesco Missanelli (died 1577), Italian Roman Catholic prelate

See also
 Missanello